Atal Bihari Vajpayee Indian Institute of Information Technology and Management, also known as Indian Institute of Information Technology and Management, is a higher-education institute located in Gwalior, Madhya Pradesh, India. Established in 1997 and named for Atal Bihari Vajpayee, it was recognized as an Institute of National Importance.

Campus 
The institute is located on a  campus near Gwalior Fort.  It is a residential campus as the faculty and its students live on campus.  It houses several departmental blocks with academic block houses, lecture theatres, seminar halls, library, laboratories and faculty offices, administrative block, an open amphitheatre, indoor sports complex and the student hostels.  There are three hostels for boys and one for girls.  The campus has a variety of plants including those with medicinal properties. The institute initially operated from a temporary site in Madhav Institute of Technology and Science Gwalior and later shifted to its own facility.

Library

The college was initially equipped with a main reference library with a capacity of 24,000 books and a reading room adjacent to it, inside the academic block itself. Recently, the college has opened a large three-story central library adjacent to the academic block that has centralized air-conditioning and has a capacity of 80,000 books. Moreover, e-resources and online journals are maintained as part of a digital library to further facilitate the students and scholars in their quest for knowledge. The library subscribes to journals, periodicals, and magazines in the area of IT and management.  The library has videotapes and video CDs for use by the students.

The Ministry of Human Resource Development (MHRD) set up the "Indian National Digital Library in Engineering Sciences and Technology" (INDEST) consortium. This provides students with a collection of journals and industrial database like IEEE, EBSCO, CME, ABI/Inform complete, Association for Computing Machinery Digital Library, IEEE - IEEE/IET Electronic Library (IEL)|IEL Online, J-Gate Engineering and technology, ProQuest Science journals and Springer Verlag's link.

Academics

Academic programmes
The institute offers various graduate and postgraduate programs, which include Master of Technology (MTech) in various information technology fields, Master of Business Administration (MBA), PhD, and a five-year integrated BTech/MTech or BTech/MBA program. In 2017, the institute opened B.Tech CSE program which is its first graduation course. In addition, Management Development Programmes and Faculty Development Programmes are offered. It has been collaborating with Google since 2008 on the development of updated academic curriculum and collaboration, under the direction of Siddhartha Paul Tiwari, in relation to emerging technologies.

Achievements 
A team from the institute won the 2008 ACM ICPC Asia Regional Contest, an IT programming contest held in Kanpur.

Rankings

References

External links 

 

Gwalior
Universities in Madhya Pradesh
Universities and colleges in Gwalior
Educational institutions established in 1997
1997 establishments in Madhya Pradesh
Memorials to Atal Bihari Vajpayee